Sjøli Church is a parish church of the Church of Norway in Rendalen Municipality in Innlandet county, Norway. It is located in the village of Sjølisand. It is the church for the Sjøli parish which is part of the Nord-Østerdal prosti (deanery) in the Diocese of Hamar. The brown, wooden church was built in a long church design in 1914 using plans drawn up by the architect Hans Jacob Sparre. The church seats about 110 people.

History
In 1883, a new cemetery was constructed in Sjølisand. About 30 years later, the parish began planning for the construction of an annex chapel at the cemetery. Hans Jacob Sparre was hired to design the new chapel. The new log building was consecrated in October 1914. Many years later, the chapel was upgraded to parish church status.

Media gallery

See also
List of churches in Hamar

References

Rendalen
Churches in Innlandet
Long churches in Norway
Wooden churches in Norway
20th-century Church of Norway church buildings
Churches completed in 1914
1914 establishments in Norway